"Human" is a song recorded by American singer-songwriter Christina Perri for her second studio album, Head or Heart (2014). The song was written by Perri and Martin Johnson, who also produced the song. It was released on November 18, 2013, as the lead single for the album. Released to generally positive reviews, "Human" has since become a Top 10 Adult Pop hit in the United States, as well as her third top 40 entry on the Billboard Hot 100. It was certified Platinum by RIAA in June 2014.

Background
"Human" was written by Perri and Martin Johnson in April 2013, and was produced by Martin Johnson.  The song was written at the end of a long session of song-writing, and originally Perri wasn't sure if the song would be in the album because she felt it was too personal, but because of the positive reactions to the song, she decided to put in the album and chose it as the lead single.  The song was released on iTunes on November 18, 2013, and Perri debuted the song with a performance on The Queen Latifah Show the same day. "Human" impacted American hot adult contemporary radio on December 9, 2013.

Composition
Like previous singles "Jar of Hearts" and "Arms", "Human" is largely built around a piano melody and showcases her voice. It is a pop power ballad written in key Ab major, and features a strong build-up towards the chorus.  The song features a string arrangement by notable arranger David Campbell. Critics have compared Perri's honest, heart-on-her-sleeve songwriting to that of Taylor Swift. Lyrically, "Human" uses relatable yet specific details to describe the vulnerability of being human. The verses find Perri musing the things she would do for love, yet as she sings in the chorus, "I'm only human / And I bleed when I fall down."

Critical reception
"Human" was acclaimed by critics. Sam Lansky of Idolator applauded the song for being "properly dramatic" in its approach, noting that Perri "[sings] her heart out over triumphant production," resulting in what he described as an "epic and radio-friendly" ballad. Amy Sciarretto of PopCrush responded positively to the confessional nature of the lyrics, as well as Perri's "angelic" voice, of which she "shows a wider range than ever" in her delivery. She rated the song 3.5 stars out of 5. Robert Copsey of Digital Spy described it as a "gothic-tinged" ballad that is "as satisfying as it comes", and rated it three stars out of five.

Commercial performance
On its week of release, the song debuted on the Billboard Bubbling Under Hot 100 Singles chart at No. 1.  It entered the Billboard Hot 100 chart at No. 90 for the chart dated February 22, 2014, and peaked at No. 31 on the Hot 100 for the chart dated May 3, 2014. The song reached its millionth digital sales mark in June 2014.

The song debuted on at No. 71 on the Canadian Hot 100 chart on its week of release.

Music video
The official music video for "Human" premiered on January 3, 2014 and was uploaded to Perri's YouTube account the following day. The video was directed by Elliott Sellers (former drummer of American death metal band, Job for a Cowboy) and features Perri as a robot sitting in a white room, with close-ups of the mechanics working inside of her body. As Perri begins to move, various body parts are shown to be bionic. Towards the end of the video, Perri begins to transform from a machine into a human as sparks fall behind her; her tattoos reappear as a symbol of her individuality and her robotic heart begins to pump fluid around her body.

Charts

Weekly charts

Year ends charts

Certifications

Release history

References

External links
 

2013 singles
Pop ballads
Christina Perri songs
2013 songs
Songs written by Martin Johnson (musician)
Atlantic Records singles
Songs written by Christina Perri
2010s ballads